Kakizome (literally "first writing") is a Japanese term for the first calligraphy written at the beginning of a year, traditionally on January 2. Other terms include kissho, shihitsu and hatsusuzuri.

Traditionally, kakizome was performed using ink rubbed with the first water drawn from the well on New Year's Day. Seated facing a favourable direction, people would write Chinese poetry containing auspicious words and phrases such as long life, spring, or perennial youth. These poems were then often burned.  

In modern times, people often write out auspicious kanji rather than poems. School pupils up to senior high school are assigned kakizome as their winter holiday homework.
Each year on January 5, several thousand calligraphers gather at the Nippon Budokan in Tokyo's Chiyoda-ku for a kakizome event that is widely covered by media.

The kakizome paper is usually burned on January 14 in the Sagicho festival. If the burning paper flies high, it is said that the person will be able to write a more fair hand.

References
Gail Benjamin: Japanese Lessons: A Year in a Japanese School Through the Eyes of an American Anthropologist and Her Children. NYU Press 1998, S.120
New Year's In Japan - City News Urayasu, 2006-1-1, no. 105

External links 
 Examples of children's kakizome
Washi: Japanese Papermaking Workshop - Teacher's Guide des Robert C. Williams Museum (Georgia Tech), p. 22 
Kakizome contest in Tokyo - news notice on  ABC
The Newsletter of the Japanese Friendship Garden of Phoenix - Issue January/February 2009

Japanese calligraphy
New Year in Japan
January observances
Winter traditions